Artificial hair integrations, more commonly known as hair extensions, hair weaves, and fake hair add length and fullness to human hair. Hair extensions are usually clipped, glued, or sewn on natural hair by incorporating additional human or synthetic hair. These methods include tape-in extensions, clip-in or clip-on extensions, micro/nano rings, fusion method, weaving method, and wigs.

Background 
A hair weave is a human or artificial hair utilized for integration with one's natural hair. Weaves can alter one's appearance for long or short periods of time by adding further hair to one's natural hair or by covering the natural hair together with human or synthetic hairpieces. Weaving additional human or synthetic pieces can enhance one's hair by giving it volume and length, and by adding color without the damage of chemicals or by adopting a different hair texture than that of their own. However, hair loss can occur either along the front hairline or above the ears due to the wearing of specific hairstyles for a prolonged period of time, such as weaves. Such hair loss is known as traction alopecia.

By the late 17th century, wigs in various shapes and sizes became the latest fashion trend. Hair weaves in particular, did not grow interested until the 1950s; even during that time celebrities had been the only ones using them. When the "long, disco-haired" era evolved there became a widespread use of hair weave. Since that era, hair weave has only become more popular. Most human hair weaves come from Asian countries like Vietnam, India, and China.

Installation method

Pinchbraid extensions were invented in the 1980s. They are individual locks of hair tied into the native hair with a durable upholstery thread.

Tape-in hair extensions last from four to eight weeks and the hair can be gently combed and washed while wearing the extensions. In addition, the extensions need to be treated with specialized shampoos, conditioners and styling products to keep them in top condition. The extensions can be taken off easily by the application of glue remover and can be easily installed by using liquid adhesive or glue tape.

Clip-in weaves, also known as clip-in hair extensions, can be integrated into natural hair to add length and volume. The clip-in hair extensions most commonly come in as a long strand of one contoured piece that can be cut into multiple layers for creating separate layers on a user's head. When the hair is purchased it often comes with clips, which are sewn into the hair. It is also possible to buy the hair (in bundles) and the clips separately; the clips can then be sewn on by the purchaser or by a stylist.

This technique is the least permanent and lacks the disadvantages such as traction alopecia associated with glue extensions. The hair weft has small toupée clips sewn onto them. Usually a set of clip-in extensions averages eight strips of human hair in varying widths from two inches to eight inches. Starting at the nape of the neck, the hair is sectioned neatly, then the weft is placed onto this section with the clips open and facing the scalp. Each clip is snapped into place. It can be helpful to lightly backcomb each section for a more secure grip. This is repeated until each clip-in weft is in place. Clip-ins can be worn for an entire day; however, some people take them off to sleep.

Bonding is a method of weaving that lasts for a shorter period of time in comparison to sew-in weaving. It involves the application of hair glue to a section of wefted hair then onto a person's natural hair; special hair adhesives are used in bonding to prevent damage to one's natural hair. This technique is commonly used and does not cause damage to the hair unless taken out without proper directions from a professional. It is advised that weave bonding be installed for up to 3 weeks because the glue begins to loosen up and lessens the attractiveness of the hair. There are 2 types of bonding methods: soft bond and hard bond. Soft bond is flexible and comfortable to wear and is made using latex/acrylic based adhesives. Hard bond is the industry term for bonding treatments whose adhesive contains cyanoacrylate, or super glue. Hard bond adhesives last longer than soft bond adhesives because it is not water based and therefore less susceptible to deterioration. Nonetheless, the hard bond adhesives are not as comfortable as the soft bond adhesive because they are rigid. These bond attachments generally last 4–6 weeks before a maintenance appointment is necessary.

Fusion method involves a machine similar to a hot glue gun used to attach human hair extensions to individual strands of one's natural hair of about 1/8 to 1/4 inch squared sections for a truly authentic look. Another option for fusion attachments is using hair which is pre-tipped with a keratin adhesive. A heat clamp is then used to melt the adhesive to attach the extension hair to the natural hair. Fusion weave allows washing hair frequently and the use of regular hair products such as hair gels. This technique is very time consuming taking 3 or more hours. They need re-positioning every 2–3 months as the natural hair grows. Due to various chemicals in the glue, which may cause hair loss and scalp irritation, combined with heat, this method is more damaging to natural hair.

Micro ring (also known as micro-bead or micro loop) hair extensions use small metal rings or beads (usually aluminum) and can sometimes be lined with silicone to attach the extension hair. They are fixed to small sections of natural hair and tightened using a special tool that clamps the bead around the natural hair.

The micro-beads are designed to be small enough so that they are not visible in normal use. They need re-positioning every two to three months as the natural hair grows and the micro-beads move away from the scalp.

As they do not use heat or adhesives, these hair extensions should cause less damage than some types of extensions, if placed correctly and properly taken care of. The sizing makes a difference on the weight of the extensions, the feel, and the visibility. Some micro-beads are so tiny that they mimic a non-surgical hair transplant. The stylist installing the extensions should determine what size of micro rings/beads is best for the client's hair length and texture, prior to installation on the head.

Netting is a technique which involves braiding natural tresses under a thin, breathable net that serves as a flat surface onto which stylists can weave extensions. This method requires the use of hair net or cap to be placed over the person's hair that has been braided. Netting provides more flexibility than track placement because the stylist is not limited to sewing extensions to a braid. With netting there is the option of sewing the hair wefts onto the net or gluing. This technique is not as time-consuming when compared to the other hair techniques because it takes about 2–4 hours to complete.

The most recent development in weave extensions is lace fronts, which are made from a nylon mesh material formed into a cap that is then hand-ventilated by knotting single strands of hair into the tiny openings of the cap, giving the hair a more natural and authentic continuity than typical extensions. It has few variations including straight, wavy and curly. Furthermore, the extension units can be woven in or attached to a person's hairline with special adhesives. To ensure a proper fit, head measurements are taken into account with this type of weave. A lace frontal is best placed by a professional since more advanced weaving and hair extensions are used. This method is commonly used because it makes it possible to have access to a certain part of the scalp.

Tracking involves the braiding of a person's natural hair. This is one of the most commonly used methods as it is quite fast and lasts considerably longer than other techniques. However, it does not allow for regular hair maintenance. In order to prevent the hair from being bumpy or uneven, the hair is sewn horizontally or vertically across the head from one side to the other starting from the bottom. The braided hair is then sewn down and the hair weft extensions are sewn onto the braids. A weave can consist of a few tracks, or the whole head can be braided for a full head weave. With a full head weave, the braids are sewn down or covered with a net. Extensions are then sewn to the braids. The number of tracks used depends on the desired look.

Types of hair 
The most popular and commonly available form of hair is known as premium hair. It is sold in most beauty supply stores or online. The roots and tips of hairs are interwoven in premium hair which causes tangling. This is due to the opposing cuticle layers catching onto one another. However, as it is the most inexpensive type of hair, it is a best seller.

Premium hair comes in two types:
Regular premium hair: generally the least expensive type of hair. The cuticles are present in different directions and the hair is prone to tangling.
"Tangle-free" premium hair: this is obtained by chemically removing the cuticles using an acid bath. This process reduces the friction among hairs, leaving the remaining hair tangle-free. In order to give the appearance of natural healthy hair, a laminate is applied to the hair to give it a shiny and silky look.

Synthetic fiber
Synthetic fibers are made of various different materials and contain no human hair. Synthetic fibers come in weave (weft) and single strands (bulk) for braids. They do not last as long as human hair because they can be easily damaged by friction and heat. The quality of fibers varies greatly. Depending on quality, they may never look like human hair, as they can be stiff and move differently from human hair. Synthetic fibers are much less expensive than human hair. Heating appliances such as curling irons, flat irons, and straightening combs generally should never be used on most types of synthetic hair. There are some newer versions of synthetic fibers that are more resistant, human-like fibers that can be heat processed allowing for heat styling.

Futura
Futura is a type of synthetic fiber that can withstand heat up to 400 °F (200 °C), and can actually outlast human hair. It is very similar to human hair given it is tangle-free and has a natural sheen. It can be straightened or curled, however, it takes longer to set and futura cannot be colored. It is sometimes sold as a human hair blend.

Human hair
The human hair shaft is made up of dead, hard protein, called keratin, in three layers. The inner layer is called the medulla and may not be present. The next layer is the cortex and the outer layer is the cuticle. The cortex makes up the majority of the hair shaft. The cuticle is formed by tightly packed scales in an overlapping structure similar to roof shingles. Most hair-conditioning products attempt to affect the cuticle. There are pigment cells that are distributed throughout the cortex, giving the hair its characteristic color. The cuticle is a hard shingle-like layer of overlapping cells, some five to twelve deep, formed from dead cells that form scales which give the hair shaft strength and protect the inner structure of the hair. The hair cuticle is the first line of defense against all forms of damage; it acts as a protective barrier for the softer inner structures, including the medulla and cortex. 

The cuticle is responsible for much of the mechanical strength of the hair fiber. A healthy cuticle is more than just a protective layer, as the cuticle also controls the water content of the fiber. Much of the shine that makes healthy hair so attractive is due to the cuticle. In the hair industry, the only way to obtain the very best hair (with cuticle intact and facing the same direction) is to use the services of "hair collectors," who cut the hair directly from people's heads, and bundle it as ponytails. This hair is called virgin cuticle hair, or just cuticle hair.

*Hair extensions made of true virgin, raw (cuticle) hair have the most durability and ease of use as the integrity of the hair has not been broken or altered by the method of collection. This continues to be true if this hair is then simply wefted or sewn on a track, without any processed chemical or steamed done on the hair.

Human hair industry
The selling of human hair for weaves, wigs, and other hair styling products is an industry that generates hundreds of millions of dollars annually and is growing as a large export economy in some Asian countries, such as India, at a rate of 10–30 percent annually. In India, a large portion of the hair is sourced from Hindu temples where hair is donated for religious practices, particularly in honor of the Hindu god venkateswara swamy (Balaji). This hair is highly sought out for its 'virgin', untreated qualities, as well as its great length. From there the hair is cleaned and the color can be altered for international style tastes.

Color, texture and quality

Color
Artificial hair colors:

Manufacturers of artificial hair use a standard scale to classify the hair by color. The lower the number on the package, generally, the darker the color. 1 usually denotes darkest black, and would become lighter with increasing number value, ending at the lightest blonde, then finally white. These colors vary greatly from one manufacturer to another, and certain specialty hair suppliers also create their own signature patterns and colors.

Human hair colors:

Come in an endless variety from platinum blonde to darkest natural black. True raw blonde human hair is scarce and is highly sought after.

Textures of human and artificial hair 
Textures of artificial hair vary from very straight to extremely curly, or kinky. The exact names of curl patterns vary by brand, and the possibilities of curl patterns with synthetic hair are endless, but some examples of packaged textures include:
Silky straight - straight and smooth, East Asian-like hair.
Yaki - straight, usually mimicking the texture of relaxed Afro-Caribbean hair.
Deep wave - while generally not a true 'wave', it can be made to look like spiral curls/3a hair.
Loose deep wave or romance wave - looser version of the deep wave, softer, more romantic curls.
Kinky curly (very tightly coiled "s" or "z" shaped curl pattern ) - often used to recreate the look of natural Afro-Caribbean hair.
Wet and wavy, can be packaged as Spanish wave or Indian wave - usually human hair is used, and is either naturally curly or permanently waved to appear so. Characterized as having soft, natural-looking curls that revert to a curly state when wet, characteristic of South Asian and Latin American hair.

Textures of human hair vary from very straight to extremely curly or kinky, and all the naturally occurring textures that are in-between. The exact curl patterns vary by person and so the possibilities of curl patterns with true raw hair are endless.
Coarse or smooth straight - Straight with or without a wave.
Curly wave - similar to the look and feel of spiral curls/3a hair.
Deep wave - looser version of the deep wave.
Kinky curly (very tightly coiled "s" or "z" shaped curl pattern ) - It is often used to recreate the look of natural Afro-Caribbean hair.

Hair preparation terminology

 Virgin hair is hair that hasn't been colored or processed in any way and may or may not still be growing from the head. This should include any steam processes. 

 Raw hair is hair that also has not been colored or processed in any way. This includes steam processes. Some consider this to be less evasive and not actually processed as the raw or virgin undergoes a multiple day steaming process to create long-lasting curls or wave patterns without the damage of chemicals. This process guarantees consistent curls and waves that have a uniform texture. Premium raw or virgin hair has had absolutely no processes of any sort including steam done on the hair. This is essential as true premium raw/virgin hair has a naturally occurring texture that when matched to the owner of the raw/virgin hair extensions creates a look that is unbeatable in look and feel. 

 Remy hair is the modern spelling of the word 'remis', which derives from the French verb 'remettre' (meaning 'to put back'). Historically, it meant that all hair (human or animal) in any given bundle was 'put back' to the original direction it grew in (i.e. when there was no 'upside-down' or inverted hair), and that it was thereby re-aligned root to point (tip). Over time, its meaning along with its spelling has changed. Today it means that the hair in question was never inverted in the first place because it had been cut from the donor and kept in its original grown alignment. However, nowadays the word 'remy' does not always mean that a bundle of hair is indeed non-inverted, as the majority of the factories that produce wigs tend to sell incorrectly labelled products. Very often the hair gets passed on as "remy" owing to the fact that most people, including many hair professionals, are unable to detect the difference. To do so, one needs to receive special training to "feel" the cuticles of hair. Whereas real remy hair preparation requires intensive labor and high skills, many so-called 'remy' hair products have been simply acid-treated in factories to have a large portion of the cuticles removed, so that tangling could be prevented. 

 Single drawn or double drawn hair may be produced from any ponytail or group of ponytails. The single drawn bundles will result in only the shortest hairs being removed from the original ponytail. The amount of shortest hairs removed depends upon the hair preparers' (workers') instructions. The equipment used is a hackle and not a drawing board (or drawing mat). The single drawn hair bundle will contain a variety of different hair strand lengths, only the very shortest having been removed. It is commonplace in the hair extension industry to call any hair 'single drawn' regardless of whether it has been drawn at all. The quality of the hair itself is irrelevant to the drawing process. It is generally of a lower price bracket than double-drawn hair due to shorter hair still being contained within.
 Double drawn indicates the manual hand process of sorting any given amount of hair into its various lengths and later retying accordingly into new bundles. The equipment used is a pair of drawing boards (or drawing mats). The result being that each new bundle formed contains only the same lengths of hair strands. The term 'double' is used because the process involves drawing (pulling out) the hair from drawing boards (or drawing mats) twice. The hair is drawn first in one direction and then afterwards in the other direction. Double drawn hair will have (nearly) as many hair strands at one end as the other and appear much thicker and not wispy at the end. This process is very laborious, and therefore makes the hair very expensive. There are not many articles available to explain this precise procedure due to industry secrecy. It is commonplace in the hair extension industry to call any hair 'double drawn', even when it isn't. It is likely that hair labeled as 'double drawn' has not been drawn at all.

Methods of integration

The misnomer of 'tracks' comes from the common, long-lasting method of integrating wefts, known as the 'track and sew' method. The 'tracks' are usually cornrows, braided in the direction of how the hair will fall. Toward the face or away, with or without a part, the tracks build the foundation of how the end result will look. The wefts are then sewn onto the braids, usually with a specially made, blunt-ended needle. The needle can be curved or straight. There are many different colors of specially-made thread to choose from, depending on what color of hair you will be integrating. Darker hair lends to darker thread. When the hair is braided at a high level of tension, the client is at risk for traction alopecia.

Wefts may also be bonded directly to the clients' hair using special bonding glue. Care must be taken not to bond the wefts directly to the scalp, as it can cause sensitivities in some clients. A patch test is frequently recommended, as per manufacturer's directions. Glue has become less popular since it was discovered that glue can cause severe and often permanent health issues such as headaches, bald spots and dermatitis.

The "invisible part" is a technique used by hair stylists that hides any evidence that the person is wearing an extension. The extension will appear as if it is growing directly from the person's scalp. This look can be achieved with either the sew-in or glue method. This technique allows a long lasting method of attaching commercial hair to the natural hair. Application generally takes about an hour. It will last about 8 weeks.

Bulk hair can also be bonded to the hair, using many different methods, from clips to adhesive.

In South East Asia, the practical method of lengthening-re-bondage has been in use since the mid-19th century. The lengthening-re-bondage method consists of two treatments. The first treatment consists of re-bonding and ironing. The second treatment of lengthening-re-bondage involves gentle pulling and tugging of the hair. These two treatments are highly effective in lengthening hair without causing serious damage.

Bulk hair can also be added with thread if bonding is not suitable. This may be because the wearer has excessively oily hair or because there is a need to wash hair daily. Adding hair extensions with thread means that damage to the natural hair can be avoided and that the hair extension attachment areas are not vulnerable to external elements like heat, oils and water.

Shampooing and styling of integrations
Shampooing of artificial hair integrations can be as easy as shampooing real hair, with some considerations. For instance, many manufacturers suggest using a mild shampoo, or even a wig shampoo.

Directions included with the integrations may indicate what type of shampoo to use; the methods of brushing, combing and drying that are most advisable; and what heat setting to use when drying the hair, or if it is even advisable to do so.

The same care taken when shampooing must also be used when styling artificial hair. It is often recommended that the texture of hair purchased should be the style in which the hair is worn. Using heat to straighten curly hair, or to curl straight hair, damages it. The more damage the hair sustains, the shorter the lifespan of the artificial hair.

Most human hair extensions can be treated as real hair, albeit more gently. *Since human hair extensions are usually heavily processed to achieve uniform color and texture, a mild shampoo is recommended, along with a light conditioner to reduce tangling. When shampooing it is suggested that a sulfate-free and alcohol-free product be used, since those contents cause frizz and dry out the hair. Cool water is also recommended when shampooing, to reduce or prevent matting and excessive tangling. Having to remove snarls and tangles loosens the foundation of the integrations and further damages the hair. It is best to shampoo the hair in a top down motion.

*An important factor concerning the care of true, raw (remy, virgin) human hair extensions, since this hair has had absolutely no processes, chemical or steam done, is that these extensions are simply human hair and can be simply shampooed or washed as much as desired.

Human rights
In July 2020 American authorities seized 11.8 tons of natural hair products which had allegedly been produced in the Xinjiang re-education camps by slave labor. The products were seized at the border in New York due to the suspected human rights violations associated with their production.

See also
 List of hairstyles

References

Further reading

External links
 
 

Hairstyles
Wigs
Human appearance
Articles containing video clips
Cultural appropriation